Zakes Mda, legally Zanemvula Kizito Gatyeni Mda (born 1948) is a South African novelist, poet and playwright and he is the son of politician A. P. Mda. He has won major South African and British literary awards for his novels and plays. He is currently a Patron of the Etisalat Prize for Literature.

Early life and education
Zanemvula Mda was born in Herschel, South Africa, in 1948. and completed the Cambridge Overseas Certificate at Peka High School, Lesotho, in 1969. He pursued his BFA (Visual Arts and Literature) at the International Academy of Arts and Literature, Zurich, Switzerland, in 1976. He completed a MFA (Theater) and a MA (Mass Communication and Media) in 1984 at Ohio University, United States. He completed his PhD at the University of Cape Town, South Africa, in 1989.

Career
When he started publishing, he adopted the pen name of Zakes Mda. In addition to writing novels and plays, he taught English and creative writing in South Africa and the United Kingdom.

Most recently, he went to the United States, where he became a professor in the English Department at Ohio University in Athens, Ohio. He has been a visiting professor at Yale and the University of Vermont. As of July 2021, he is a Lecturer in Advanced Academic Programs at Johns Hopkins University.

Mda is a founding member and currently (as of 2011) serves on the advisory board of African Writers Trust, "a non-profit entity which seeks to coordinate and bring together African writers in the Diaspora and writers on the continent to promote sharing of skills and other resources, and to foster knowledge and learning between the two groups."

On 8 June 2012, Mda was awarded an honorary doctorate of the University of Cape Town for his contributions to world literature. His novels have been translated into 21 languages, the translation of Ways of Dying into Turkish being the latest.

Literary works
Mda's first novel, Ways of Dying (1995), takes place during the transitional years that marked South Africa's transformation into a democratic nation.  It follows the character of Toloki.  After finding himself destitute, he invents a profession as a "Professional Mourner."  He traverses the violent urban landscape of an unnamed South African city, finding an old love amidst the internecine fighting present in the townships and squatter settlements.

The Heart of Redness (2000), Mda's third novel, is inspired by the history of Nongqawuse, a Xhosa prophetess whose prophecies catalyzed the Cattle Killing of 1856–1857.  Xhosa culture split between Believers and Unbelievers, adding to existing social strain, famine and social breakdown.  It is believed that 20,000 people died of starvation during that time. In the novel, Mda continually shifts back and forth between the present day and the time of Nongqawuse to show the complex interplay between history and myth.  He dramatizes the uncertain future of a culture whose troubled relationship with the colonizing force of Empire, as well as their own civil factions, threatens to extinguish their home of Qolorha-by-Sea. Mda's account of the Cattle Killing draws heavily on that of historian Jeff Peires in his book The Dead Will Arise (Mda acknowledges this at the outset of his novel). Like Peires, Mda identifies Mhlkaza, Nongqawuse's uncle and one of the key players in the event, with William Goliath, the first Xhosa person baptised in the Anglican church.

Bibliography
 (1977) New South African Writing
 (1979) We Shall Sing for the Fatherland
 (1979) Dead End
 (1979) Dark Voices Ring
 (1980) The Hill
 (1982) Banned: A Play for Radio
 (1982) Summer Fires
 (1986) Bits of Debris: The Poetry of Zakes Mda
 (1988) And the Girls in their Sunday Dresses
 (1989) Joys of War
 (1990) The Plays of Zakes Mda
 (1991) The Nun's Romantic Story
 (1992) Soho Square
 (1993) When People Play People
 (1993) And the Girls in Their Sunday Dresses: Four Works
 (1995) Ways of Dying
 (1995) She Plays with the Darkness
 (1998) Melville 67
 (2000) The Heart of Redness
 (2002) The Madonna of Excelsior
 (2002) Fools, Bells and the Importance of Eating: Three Satires
 (2005) The Whale Caller
 (2007) Cion
 (2009) Black Diamond
 (2011) Sometimes There is a Void: Memoirs of an Outsider
 (2012) Our Lady of Benoni
 (2013) The Sculptors of Mapungubwe
 (2014) Rachel's Blue
 (2015) Little Suns
 (2019) The Zulus of New York
 (2021) Wayfarers' Hymns

Awards
 1978: Amstel Playwright of the Year Award, special merit award for We Shall Sing for the Fatherland
 1979: Amstel Playwright of the Year Award, winner for The Hill
 1997: M-Net Book Prize, Ways of Dying
 2001: Commonwealth Writers' Prize: Africa, The Heart of Redness
 2001: Hurston-Wright Legacy Award, The Heart of Redness
 2001: Sunday Times Fiction Prize, The Heart of Redness
 2004: Top Ten South African Books published in the Decade of Democracy, The Madonna of Excelsior
 2017: Barry Ronge Fiction Prize, Little Suns

See also
 The Annual Steve Biko Memorial Lecture
 Flaxman Qoopane

References

South African male novelists
1948 births
Living people
People from the Eastern Cape
South African male poets
South African dramatists and playwrights
Male dramatists and playwrights
20th-century South African novelists
20th-century South African poets
20th-century dramatists and playwrights
21st-century South African novelists
21st-century South African poets
21st-century dramatists and playwrights
Ohio University faculty
20th-century South African male writers
21st-century South African male writers